László Paskai, O.F.M. (8 May 1927 – 17 August 2015) was a Hungarian cardinal of the Roman Catholic Church, He served as the archbishop of Esztergom-Budapest from 1987 to 2002.

He was one of the cardinal electors who participated in the 2005 papal conclave that elected Pope Benedict XVI. He was Spiritual Protector and Chaplain General of the Orléans obedience of the Military and Hospitaller Order of Saint Lazarus of Jerusalem from 2004 to 2012.

Early life
László Paskai was born to Jewish parents who had converted to the Roman Catholic faith before the birth of their son and who later were murdered during The Holocaust.

Clerical career
He was ordained a priest at the age of 23, on 3 March 1951, joining the Order of Friars Minor. After his ordination he did pastoral work in the diocese of Nagyvarad before being sent to Budapest for further studies. In Szeged, he served as episcopal master of ceremonies from 1952 to 1955. After this he was a faculty member and librarian of the seminary, 1955–1962. Thereafter serving as prefect of the Interdiocesan Seminary, faculty member and spiritual director until 1965. He later served as a faculty member and spiritual director and finally rector of the Central Seminary, Budapest. On 2 March 1978 he was chosen Apostolic Administrator of Veszprém, becoming a bishop that same day, with the titular see of Bavagaliana.

Pope John Paul II appointed him Archbishop of Veszprém on 31 March 1979. He was appointed Primate of Hungary and Archbishop of Esztergom on 3 March 1987. He was created Cardinal-Priest of Santa Teresa al Corso d'Italia. In 1993 the dioceses of Esztergom was united with that of Budapest, so that Cardinal Paskai was the first Archbishop of Esztergom-Budapest. Cardinal Paskai retired as Archbishop of Esztergom-Budapest in 2002.

He met with U.S. President George H. W. Bush on 13 October 1989.

Retirement
After his retirement he lived in Esztergom-Szentgyörgymező, not far from the St Adalbert basilica. In 2005 he participated in the Papal Conclave which elected Pope Benedict XVI.

On 17 July 2011, he celebrated the last in a series of requiems for Otto von Habsburg, Hungary's last Crown Prince and since pretender to the throne, in St. Stephen's Basilica in Budapest. He died on 17 August 2015 at the age of 88.

Distinctions
 Spiritual Protector of the separated Orléans Obedience of the Order of Saint Lazarus (2005)

Notes

References
 
 
 

1927 births
2015 deaths
Converts to Roman Catholicism from Judaism
21st-century Hungarian cardinals
Hungarian people of Jewish descent
20th-century Hungarian cardinals
Hungarian Friars Minor
Archbishops of Esztergom
Bishops of Veszprém
People from Szeged
Cardinals created by Pope John Paul II
Recipients of the Order of Saint Lazarus (statuted 1910)
Members of the Order of the Holy Sepulchre
Franciscan cardinals